Longiculter siahi is a species of cyprinid fish found in Southeast Asia where it is found in Cambodia, Laos and Thailand.  It is the only member of its genus. It was described by the American ichthyologist Henry Weed Fowler from two specimens collected from central Thailand in 1937. There have been no further records of this species from Thailand and there is some doubt as to the validity of this species. There have been reports of this species from Cambodia in 1985 and from southern Lao PDR but the identification has yet to be confirmed. The IUCN therefore classify this species as Data Deficient.

References
 

Cyprinid fish of Asia
Fish of Thailand
Fish described in 1937